Hans Verlan Andersen (November 6, 1914 – July 16, 1992) was a general authority of the Church of Jesus Christ of Latter-day Saints (LDS Church) and a professor at Brigham Young University (BYU).

Andersen was called to the LDS Church's First Quorum of the Seventy in April 1986. On April 1, 1989 he was transferred to the newly created Second Quorum of the Seventy. On October 5, 1991, he was released from his service as a general authority. He died of cancer on July 16, 1992.<ref>"H. Verlan Andersen Dies", Ensign, October 1992.</ref>

Early life and education
Andersen was born on 6 Nov 1914 in Logan, Utah to Hans Andersen and Mynoa Richardson, and spent his earliest years on a dry farm in Blue Creek, Utah. He was baptized by his father on May 6, 1923, and the next year his family moved to Virden, New Mexico to be closer to his Andersen and Richardson grandparents in the Gila Valley. His paternal grandfather, Andrew Andersen, was from Otterup, Denmark and his paternal grandmother, Janet Henderson, was from Haddington, Scotland. His paternal grandparents both emigrated to America after joining the LDS Church. After stints in Utah and Mexico, Andrew and Janet settled in Virden, where Andersen's parents, Hans and Mynoa, moved the family in 1923-24.  Andersen grew up working on the family farm.

After finishing high school, in September 1933, Andersen received a call to serve a mission in the church's North Central States Mission, which included Minnesota, along with North and South Dakota. After returning home in October 1935, he enrolled at Gila Junior College (previously the St. Joseph Stake Academy, now Eastern Arizona College) where he was president of the sophomore class.  He graduated in 1937.

Andersen was ordained a seventy by Melvin J. Ballard of the Quorum of the Twelve Apostles in 1936. He enrolled at BYU in the fall of 1938 and graduated in June 1940 with a bachelor's degree in accounting, one month after his father died from cancer. After his father's death, he helped his mother and younger siblings move from New Mexico to Mesa, Arizona. After one load of furniture and family genealogy had been taken to Mesa, the family's home, belongings, and farm were destroyed in the Gila River flood of September 1941. After working for the Harmon Audit Company in Phoenix and Prescott from 1940 to 1942, he moved back to Mesa in the summer of 1942, where he took a job with a local CPA. In January 1943, he met Shirley Hoyt at a conference of the church's Maricopa Arizona Stake. They were married in the Salt Lake Temple on June 15, 1943 by Thomas E. McKay.

The Andersens continued to live in Arizona until they moved to Palo Alto, California in the fall of 1944 where Andersen attended law school at Stanford University. He received the Henry Newell Scholarship, and graduated in 1946 with an LL.B. degree and Order of the Coif honors. Starting January 1, 1946, he worked for Wayne Mayhew and Co. in San Francisco until he was recruited to teach law and accounting at BYU in the fall of 1946. He left teaching at BYU after one year to attend Harvard Law School, where he earned an LL.M. degree in 1948.

Professional career
After law school, Andersen set up a law and accounting practice in Phoenix and worked there until accepting another invitation to teach law and business at BYU starting in the fall of 1953. Except for a brief stint in Phoenix from 1962 to 1965, Andersen was a professor of accounting  at BYU until 1981 during the administrations of Ernest L. Wilkinson and Dallin H. Oaks.

When Brigham Young High School closed in 1968, Andersen met with a group of other BYU professors and parents with the intent of establishing a private school. They desired to have their children's academic learning enhanced and enlightened by principles of morality, religion, liberty and patriotism. The founders purchased an LDS meetinghouse in Pleasant Grove, Utah, and opened the American Heritage School in 1970 with 80 students enrolled. Today, AHS has roughly one thousand students and was honored to have President Dallin H. Oaks, of the Church of Jesus Christ of Latter-day Saints, deliver its 2011 and 2021 commencement addresses.

From 1969 to 1973, Andersen served in the Utah State Legislature.

Church Service
In the early 1980s, the Andersens were called as church service missionaries, first in Buenos Aires, Argentina and then in Lima, Peru. In April 1986, Andersen was called to be a general authority as a member of the church's First Quorum of the Seventy. From 1986 to 1989, Andersen served as a member of the presidency of the church's Mexico and Central America Area. In 1989, the Andersens returned to Argentina when he was assigned to the South America South Area. In 1990, he became a counselor in the general presidency of the church's Sunday School, while also serving in the presidency of the Utah Central Area. Upon returning to Utah, he was diagnosed with cancer. In the church's October 1991 general conference, Andersen was released as a general authority and gave his final conference address. He died of cancer in on July 16, 1992.

Political Views
Andersen was a supporter of the original intent of the U.S. Constitution and was critical of unconstitutional government. As he explained in his first book:

As originally interpreted, the United States Constitution denied government the right to regulate and control the citizen in the use of his property. Over the years the commerce clause and the general welfare clause have been so interpreted as to permit both the state and Federal governments to regiment labor, agriculture, manufacturing, transportation, communication, finance and all other forms of economic activity. Today, if there is any limit on the power of government to regulate, no one knows what that limit is. (Many Are Called But Few Are Chosen, p.45)

Anecdote
Andersen is probably most well-known to Latter-day Saints by the following story, told by Thomas S. Monson, that speaks of Andersen's strict devotion to keeping the commandments.

Published worksMany Are Called But Few Are ChosenThe Book of Mormon and the ConstitutionThe Moral Basis of a Free SocietyReferences

Bibliography
 Bruce Lambert, "Prof. H. Verlan Andersen, 77; A Leader in the Mormon Church", The New York Times'', 1992-07-18

External links
 Grampa Bill's G.A. Pages: Hans Verlan Andersen

1914 births
1992 deaths
20th-century American educators
American Mormon missionaries in the United States
Eastern Arizona College alumni
Brigham Young University alumni
Stanford Law School alumni
Harvard Law School alumni
Brigham Young University faculty
Latter Day Saints from New Mexico
Latter Day Saints from Utah
Members of the First Quorum of the Seventy (LDS Church)
Members of the Second Quorum of the Seventy (LDS Church)
Counselors in the General Presidency of the Sunday School (LDS Church)
American Mormon missionaries in Argentina
American Mormon missionaries in Peru
Deaths from cancer in Utah
20th-century Mormon missionaries
American general authorities (LDS Church)
Religious leaders from New Mexico